The following lists events that happened during 1955 in Laos.

Incumbents
Monarch: Sisavang Vong 
Prime Minister: Katay Don Sasorith

Events

January
28 January 
The Royal Lao Air Force is established as the Lao Air Force. 
The Royal Lao Navy is established.

December
14 December - Laos is admitted to the United Nations under United Nations Security Council Resolution 109.
25 December - 1955 Laotian parliamentary election

References

 
1950s in Laos
Years of the 20th century in Laos
Laos
Laos